Almere Buiten is a railway station in Almere, Netherlands. It is located approximately 27 km east of Amsterdam. The station is located on the Weesp–Lelystad railway, connecting Weesp and Lelystad Centrum. The station was opened in 1987 when the line Weesp - Lelystad Centrum was built. In 1987 Almere Centrum and Almere Muziekwijk stations also opened before the Almere Buiten - Lelystad section was completed in 1988.

Almere has become a commuter city for Amsterdam. On 7 July 2008, there were 184,405 people living in Almere. The station is located in the centre of 'Almere Buiten' which translates as Outside Almere.

Train services
, the following train services call at this station:
Intercity services Dordrecht - Rotterdam - The Hague - Schiphol Airport - Amsterdam Zuid - Almere - Lelystad
Local Sprinter services Hoofddorp - Schiphol - Amsterdam Zuid - Almere Oostvaarders
Local Sprinter services The Hague - Schiphol Airport - Amsterdam Centraal - Weesp - Almere - Lelystad - Zwolle

Bus services
1 - Striphelden - Oostvaarders - Regenboogbuurt - Station Buiten - Bouwmeesterbuurt - Waterwijk - Almere Centrum - Stedenwijk - 't Oor Bus Station - Almere Haven
5 - Muziekwijk - Kruidenwijk - Almere Centrum - Parkwijk - Landgoederenbuurt - Station Buiten - Oostvaarders
10 - Station Poort - Gooisekant - Busstation 't Oor - Danswijk - Almere Buiten - Oostvaardersdiep
153 - Holendrecht - Bijlmer ArenA - Bijlmermeer - Muiden P&R - Almere Poort - Almere Muziekwijk - Almere Buiten
216 - Almere Buiten - Almere Stad - Muiden - Amstelveen - Schiphol-Oost
N11 - Station Centrum → Molenbuurt → Station Buiten → Station Oostvaarders → Station Parkwijk → Danswijk → Sallandsekant → Danswijk → Filmwijk → Station Centrum
N12 - Station Centrum → Filmwijk → Danswijk → Sallandsekant → Danswijk → Station Parkwijk → Station Oostvaarders → Station Buiten → Molenbuurt → Station Centrum

External links
NS website 
Dutch Public Transport journey planner 

Buiten
Railway stations opened in 1987
Railway stations on the Flevolijn